Janata Vidyalaya, Dandeli is a higher secondary school in Dandeli, Uttar Kannada district. It was established by the
Kanara Welfare Trust.its present principal is Mr. M.S.Itagi

The former headmasters

Notable students
 S. R. Nayak Chairman of Law Commission of Karnataka. Earlier, he was the chairman of Karnataka State Human Rights Commission. Previously Chief Justice of Chatthisgarh High Court.
 Vasudev V Shenoy - Educationist, Educational Counsellor, Konkani Activist, Plants Enthusiast, Journalist and a Social Activist.(15 Feb 1940 – 9 Mar 2015)

References

Schools in Uttara Kannada district